Pavel Kubina (born April 15, 1977) is a Czech former professional ice hockey defenceman who played in the National Hockey League (NHL) for the Tampa Bay Lightning, Toronto Maple Leafs, Atlanta Thrashers and Philadelphia Flyers.

Playing career
Kubina began his professional career with HC Vítkovice of the Czech Extraliga. He played there for four seasons, during which he was drafted in the seventh round of the 1996 NHL Entry Draft by the Tampa Bay Lightning.

Later in 1996, Kubina moved to Canada to join the Moose Jaw Warriors of the Western Hockey League (WHL), with which he scored 44 points in 61 games during the 1996–97 season. He made his NHL debut in the 1997–98 season, although he spent most of the year playing for the Adirondack Red Wings of the American Hockey League (AHL).

Kubina spent most of the next season in the NHL, scoring 21 points, while playing occasionally in the International Hockey League (IHL) for the Cleveland Lumberjacks. By the 1999–2000 season, Kubina had cemented his position in the Lightning's lineup, scoring 26 points during the season.

Kubina scored 30 and 34 points in the 2000–01 and 2001–02 seasons respectively. In the 2003–04 season, he was named to the NHL All-Star Game and won the Stanley Cup with Tampa Bay over the Calgary Flames in the Finals.

On July 1, 2006, Kubina signed a four-year, $20 million contract with the Toronto Maple Leafs. He was suspended by the NHL for the first game of the 2006–07 season for cross-checking the Detroit Red Wings' Jiří Hudler in a pre-season game.

On July 1, 2009, Kubina was traded to the Atlanta Thrashers (along with Tim Stapleton) in exchange for Garnet Exelby and Colin Stuart.

On July 2, 2010, Kubina returned to the Tampa Bay Lightning, signing a two-year contract valued at $7.7 million worth approximately $3.85 million annually. On March 9, 2011, Kubina was suspended three games for an elbow on Chicago Blackhawks forward Dave Bolland.

On February 18, 2012, Kubina was traded to the Philadelphia Flyers in exchange for Jon Kalinski, a second-round pick in either the 2012 or 2013 NHL Entry Draft and a fourth-round pick in the 2013 NHL Entry Draft. He finished the 2011–12 season with 4 points in 17 games with the Flyers.

On September 15, 2012, Kubina left the NHL to join Genève-Servette HC of the Swiss National Liga A.

On December 20, 2013, Kubina announced his retirement from professional hockey.

Career statistics

Regular season and playoffs

International

Personal life
He and his wife, Andrea, welcomed their first child, a girl, Tereza on November 9, 2006, in the Czech Republic.

References

External links

 

1977 births
Adirondack Red Wings players
Atlanta Thrashers players
Czech ice hockey defencemen
Genève-Servette HC players
HC Vítkovice players
Ice hockey players at the 2002 Winter Olympics
Ice hockey players at the 2006 Winter Olympics
Ice hockey players at the 2010 Winter Olympics
Living people
Medalists at the 2006 Winter Olympics
Moose Jaw Warriors players
National Hockey League All-Stars
Olympic bronze medalists for the Czech Republic
Olympic ice hockey players of the Czech Republic
Olympic medalists in ice hockey
People from Frýdek-Místek District
Philadelphia Flyers players
Stanley Cup champions
Tampa Bay Lightning draft picks
Tampa Bay Lightning players
Toronto Maple Leafs players
Sportspeople from the Moravian-Silesian Region
Czech expatriate ice hockey players in Canada
Czech expatriate ice hockey players in the United States
Czech expatriate ice hockey players in Switzerland